Auckley is a civil parish in the metropolitan borough of Doncaster, South Yorkshire, England.  The parish contains four listed buildings that are recorded in the National Heritage List for England.  All the listed buildings are designated at Grade II, the lowest of the three grades, which is applied to "buildings of national importance and special interest".  The parish contains the village of Auckley and the surrounding area.  The listed buildings consist of a church, its former vicarage, a mounting block adjacent to a public house, and a pair of prefabricated houses.


Buildings

References

Citations

Sources

 

Lists of listed buildings in South Yorkshire
Buildings and structures in the Metropolitan Borough of Doncaster